Joel Prince (born November 3, 1986), also known as J Prince, is a Trinidadian gospel Soca artiste and EDM producer. He is the founder and CEO of J Lab Productions, and a brand ambassador for Range Water.

Well known in his home country and across the Caribbean for his infectious music and flamboyant stage antics, J Prince's music is filled with positive messages tailored for the young, and young at heart.

Life and career
Born and raised in Morne Diablo, a fishing village on the southern coast of Trinidad, Joel Prince started off his career as a disc jockey for a sound system company. Later a local radio station recruited him where he went by the name Omega Express. In 2008 he changed his name to J Prince and released his first single, "Victory" produced by G Master. The music video for the song went to number two on the Tempo's Cross-Caribbean secular countdown.

In 2011 J Prince and Flow Master Records released his first two albums, 'Omega - A New Beginning', and 'Renaissance'. Since then, J Prince has shared the stage with Jah Cure, DJ Nicholas, Sherwin Gardner, Positive, and American Rapper Flame.

Producer Roger Ryan signed J Prince to After Touch Music in 2016.

Discography
 Om3ga: Krng (2018)
 Omega - New Beginning (2011)
 Renaissance (2011)
 Unlimited (2014)
 OM3GA:KRNG (2018)

Awards and nominations
J Prince was nominated for 'Music Producer of the Year' by the Trinidad & Tobago Gospel Awards in 2011  and received multiple nominations in the 2014 Caribbean Gospel Music Marlin Awards held in The Bahamas including 'Producer of the Year, Soca Recording of the Year', 'Calypso Recording of the Year', 'Adapted Contemporary Recording of the Year', 'Dance Recording of the Year', 'New Artist of the Year', and 'Calypso-Soca Vocal Performance of the Year-Male'. He and Sherwin Gardner shared the crown in the 'Calypso-Soca Vocal Performance of the Year-Duo/Group' category in the same year.

References

1986 births
Living people
Performers of Christian music
Soca musicians
Trinidad and Tobago singer-songwriters
21st-century Trinidad and Tobago male singers
21st-century Trinidad and Tobago singers